Warrnambool District Football League is an Australian rules football competition based in the  region of rural of Warrnambool.  It is an eleven team competition starting in April and finishing in September. The league was founded in 1946.

Clubs

Current

Former

Founding
East Stars (now known as East Warrnambool)
West End (merged with Allansford in 1971)
South Warrnambool Juniors (now known as South Rovers)
Merrivale
Russell's Creek

Premiers
1946	Russell Creek	9	6	60	def	South Juniors	8	8	56
1947	Russell Creek	7	12	54	def	West End	6	8	44
1948	West End	8	16	64	def	South Rovers	6	12	48
1949	West End	10	4	64	def	East Stars	4	12	36
1950	West End	10	12	72	def	Merrivale	1	10	16
1951	West End	10	8	68	def	Merrivale	7	9	51
1952	West End	8	5	53	def	Merrivale	5	15	45
1953	West End	19	7	121	def	Russell Creek	8	12	60
1954	West End	13	14	92	def	Merrivale	6	18	54
1955	West End	7	8	50	def	Old Collegians	4	13	37
1956	Old Collegians	13	16	94	def	South Rovers	8	10	58
1957	Russell Creek	10	11	71	def	South Rovers	6	2	38
1958	Merrivale	13	15	93	def	Russell Creek	13	13	91
1959	Tower Hill	9	10	64	def	Grassmere	3	3	21
1960	Grassmere	11	8	74	def	South Rovers	9	7	61
1961	Tower Hill	5	12	42	def	Old Collegians	3	5	23
1962	West End	7	10	52	def	Old Collegians	6	9	45
1963	Russell Creek	9	14	68	def	Old Collegians	3	7	25
1964	Old Collegians	7	13	55	def	Russell Creek	6	11	47
1965	Old Collegians	8	11	59	def	Bushfield	8	9	57
1966	Dennington	12	15	87	def	Old Collegians	9	7	61
1967	East Warrnambool	10	12	72	def	Old Collegians	10	7	67
1968	Grassmere	7	11	53	def	Merrivale	7	8	50
1969	Old Collegians	9	6	60	def	Merrivale	7	12	54
1970	Old Collegians	16	10	106	def	Dennington	10	14	74
1971	WE Allansford	13	15	93	def	Merrivale	12	18	90
1972	Grassmere	15	15	105	def	Dennington	11	11	77
1973	Russell Creek	15	11	101	def	Dennington	11	12	78
1974	Russell Creek	9	7	61	def	Merrivale	5	9	39
1975	South Rovers	15	11	101	def	Russell Creek	11	11	77
1976	WE Allansford	16	15	111	def	East Warrnambool	12	10	82
1977	Bushfield	12	16	88	def	East Warrnambool	9	6	60
1978	WE Allansford	16	14	110	def	Dennington	8	14	62
1979	Merrivale	12	10	82	def	WE Allansford	10	13	73
1980	WE Allansford	12	18	90	def	Dennington	5	9	39
1981	WE Allansford	18	14	122	Defeated	Dennington	13	15	93
1982	Dennington	19	14	128	def	WE Allansford	16	15	111
1983	WE Allansford	21	19	145	def	Dennington	9	7	61
1984	Old Collegians	14	11	95	def	WE Allansford	8	13	61
1985	South Rovers	18	11	119	def	WE Allansford	8	18	66
1986	South Rovers	14	12	96	def	Dennington	4	5	29
1987	WE Allansford	16	12	108	def	Old Collegians	13	9	87
1988	Dennington	10	14	74	def	Old Collegians	6	8	44
1989	Old Collegians	19	18	132	def	Dennington	8	11	59
1990	Russell Creek	12	11	83	def	Institute	10	15	75
1991	Merrivale	16	16	112	def	Old Collegians	14	9	93
1992	Old Collegians	8	9	57	def	Northern Districts	3	10	28
1993	South Rovers	14	10	94	def	Nirranda	8	16	64
1994	Northern Districts	19	16	130	def	East Warrnambool	9	13	67
1995	East Warrnambool	33	10	208	def	Merrivale	10	5	65
1996	Merrivale	24	20	164	def	Russell Creek	16	6	102
1997	Panmure	16	8	104	def	Merrivale	11	13	79
1998	Russell Creek	15	7	97	def	Panmure	11	10	76
1999	Nirranda	10	7	67	def	Russell Creek	5	5	35
2000	Russell Creek	10	8	68	def	Deakin Uni	9	7	61
2001	Panmure	16	3	99	def	Deakin Uni	11	11	77
2002	Panmure	11	8	74	def	Merrivale	6	8	44
2003	Merrivale	19	7	121	def	Russell Creek	17	8	110
2004	Russell Creek	22	12	144	def	Allansford	4	12	36
2005	Russell Creek	19	13	127	def	Old Collegians	14	12	96
2006	Merrivale	20	16	136	def	Dennington	12	9	81
2007	South Rovers	19	10	124	def	Timboon	17	16	118
2008	Timboon	18	12	120	def	Kolora-Noorat	17	9	111
2009	Kolora-Noorat	12	11	83	def	Timboon	5	3	33
2010       Kolora-Noorat  11      6    72    def   Dennington   9   10   64
2011       Kolora-Noorat   15   12   102   def   Old Collegians   12   15   87
2012       Panmure   9   4   58   def   Kolora-Noorat   7   12   54
2013       Panmure   13   13   91   def   Dennington   5   11   41
 2014 Merrivale 11 9 75 def Panmure 6 12 66
 2015 Dennington 12 15 87 def Merrivale 12 7 79
2016 Nirranda 6 9 46 def Old Collegians 5 8 38
2017 Kolora Noorat 17 7 109 def  Old Collegians 8 7 55
2018 Nirranda 10 11 71 def Old Collegians 5 10 40 (3 GFs in a row)
2019 Kolora-Noorat 10 8 68 def Nirranda 3 14 32
2020 League in recess due to COVID19 pandemic
2022 Nirranda 16 22 118 def Panmure 4 7 31

Changing teams
1947
East Stars
Koroit Seconds (one season only)
South Warrnambool Juniors become South Rovers
1949
Wangoom (one season only)
1951
YCW (renamed Old Collegians in 1953)
1953
Dennington
1957
Tower Hill joined from Port Fairy FL
1959
Bushfield joined from Purnim FL
Grassmere joined from Purnim FL
1965
East Stars become East Warrnambool
1970
West End and Allansford from (Purnim FL) merged to form West End Allansford
1977
W.I.A.E. (Warrnambool Institute of Advanced Education) joined
1981
Yambuk joined
1984
Tower Hill folded
1986
Northern Districts created from (merger of Bushfield and Grassmere)
1988
Yambuk folded
1992
Nirranda 
 W.I.A.E change name to Deakin University
1997
Northern Districts joined the Hampden League as North Warrnambool
Panmure
2003
Timboon Demons
Kolora-Noorat
2017
 Deakin University Folded

2006 Ladder
																	

FINALS

2007 Ladder
																	

FINALS

2008 Ladder
																	

FINALS

2009 Ladder
																	

'
FINALS																	
 																	

2010 Ladder
																	FINALS																	
 																	

2011 Ladder
																	FINALS'

References

External links
http://www.countryfootyscores.com/archive-mainmenu-129/ladders/18-2006-season/275-warrnambool-a-district-football-league.html
http://www.countryfootyscores.com/2007-ladders-mainmenu-99/223-warrnambool-a-district-football-league.html
Official Warrnambool & District Football League Website
 Full Points Footy -Warrnambool & District Football League

Australian rules football competitions in Victoria (Australia)
1946 establishments in Australia